Anton Beer-Walbrunn (29 June 1864 – 22 March 1929) was a German composer.

Life 
Beer was the 4th of five children of the teacher, cantor, sacristan and community writer Anton Beer and his wife Margarethe, née Walbrunn, in the Upper Palatinate  Kohlberg. His birthplace was demolished in 2019. In 1877 he attended the Regensburg Preparatory School, took the entrance examination for the Dominican Monastery Eichstättand subsequent use Teachers' Seminar Eichstätt in 1880, but then changed to the newly founded seminar in Amberg - today the  - and was one of the first graduates in 1882. In 1886 he passed the final examination as the best of 57 candidates.

His teacher Domkapellmeister Widmann in Eichstätt made a significant contribution to him and enabled him to study in Munich from 1888 to 1891 with Joseph Rheinberger, Hans Bußmeyer and Ludwig Abel at the Akademie der Tonkunst. In 1901 he was appointed teacher for counterpoint, composition, harmony and piano at the same Royal Academy of Music in Munich (today: Hochschule für Musik und Theater München). In 1908 he was appointed Royal Professor. In 1904 he married the painter Ida Görtz, with whom he has since used the maiden name of his mother, who died at an early age, as a double name Beer-Walbrunn.

Among his students were Télémaque Lambrino, Fritz Büchtger, Alfred Einstein, Carl Orff and Wilhelm Furtwängler as well as the musicologist and critic Eugen Schmitz.

Beer-WalbrunnSein died in Munich. His grave is located at the Munich Waldfriedhof.

The Anton Beer-Walbrunn - Kohlberg art and culture association (established June 2015, president Martin Valeske) is holding the "Beer-Walbrunn-Days" in autumn, where his music is performed again. He cooperates with the Markt Kohlberg, the city of Weiden and the district of Oberpfalz.

Work 
A. Vocal Music

Songs: There are about 60 of them.
 op. 12 after texts by Ludwig Uhland and Adolf Friedrich von Schack
 op. 13 et al. after Nikolaus Lenau
 op. 24 after Nikolaus Lenau
 op. 27 Songs for voice and piano
 op. 31 The Fugitive, Ballad for baritone and orchestra
 op. 34 Ten "Shakespeare"'s sonnets"
 op. 37 after Annette von Droste-Hülshoff
 op. 39 after Nikolaus Lenau and Ludwig Uhland
 op. 59 Sacred Songs after Eichendorff
 op. 60 after Joseph von Eichendorff
 op. 62a Songbook for high school girls
 op. 62b Songbook for Boys' Middle Schools
 op. 62c Arrangements of Christmas songs for voice, piano, violin and cello
 op. 63 Seven Songs for Voice and Piano

Choral music:
 op. 7 The Air Ghost Song for mixed choir and orchestra
 op. 16 Mahomet's Song for solos, choir, orchestra and organ after Goethe (1895)
 op. 1, 35b, 48, 66, 69 for mixed choir
 op. 35a, 53, 55, 68 for male choir

B. Stage productions:
 op. 10 The Expiation, opera after Theodor Körner, premiere 1894 at Lübeck
 op. 18 Don Quixote, opera after Miguel de Cervantes, premiere 1908 Munich, under Felix Mottl
 op. 41 Sühne, arrangement of the opera op. 10 as Volksoper in one act
 op. 43 Stage music to Hamlet (1909)
 op. 47 arrangement of the opera The three daughters of Cecrop by N. A. Strungk
 op. 50 The Beast, comedy after Anton Chekhov, first performance 1914 Karlsruhe, Court Theatre
 op. 54 incidental music to Shakespeare's Tempest, 2 acts
 op. 64 The Tempest, symbolic fairy tale in 3 acts, incidental music

Instrumental music

Orchestral works:
 op. 2 Concert Overture
 op. 5 Symphony in F minor
 op. 9 Concert Allegro in F sharp minor for violin and orchestra
 op. 11 Symphonic Fantasy D Major "Artist Life"
 op. 22 German Suite
 op. 36 Symphony E Major
 op. 38a Orchestral arrangement of a canzone by Gabrieli
 op. 38b Arrangement of a Gavotte by Schlemüller for violoncello and orchestra
 op. 40 "Cloud Cuckoo's Home", three burlesques
 op. 52 Concerto for violin and orchestra G major
 op. 61 Overture of comedy based on motives from the opera "The Beast"

Chamber music:
 op. 3 Little Fantasy in G minor for violin and piano
 op. 4 String Quartet No. 1 in C major
 op. 6 String Quartet No. 2 in C minor
 op. 8 Piano Quartet F major (premiere with Hans Pfitzner at the piano)
 op. 14 String Quartet No. 3 G Major
 op. 15 Sonata for violoncello and piano G major
 op. 17 Sketch of a piano quintet in G minor
 op. 19 String Quartet No. 4 in E minor
 op. 20 Ode for violoncello and piano G major
 op. 25 Humoresque for string quartet and piano G major
 op. 26 String Quartet No. 5 D minor
 op. 30 Sonata for violin and piano in D minor
 op. 33 Arrangements of six sonatas for violin and harpsichord by Dall'Abaco
 op. 70 Piano Quintet in G minor, arrangement of the sketch op. 17

Piano music:
 op. 21 Travel Pictures, cycle of six piano pieces
 op. 22 Deutsche Suite for four hands for piano and orchestra
 op. 23 Fugue in G minor, march and waltz (four hands)
 op. 42 Three pieces for piano solo as well as violin and piano, including:
 op. 42/2 Variations on "How beautifully the morning star shines"
 op. 56/57 piano pieces
 op. 58 Fantasy Sonata in F sharp minor for piano solo
 op. 67 Three pieces for piano solo

Organ music:
 op. 28 Drei Fugen für die Orgel (1905)
 op. 29 Drei kleine Fugen für die Orgel
 op. 32 Orgelsonate g-Moll (1906)
 op. 45 Kleine Stücke für die Orgel

Recordings 
 Anton Beer-Walbrunn – Shakespeare-Sonette und ausgewählte Lieder (Weltersteinspielung 2016). Angelika Huber (soprano), Kilian Sprau (piano). Bayer Records BR 100 390
 Süddeutsche Orgelmusik der Spätromantik. Gerhard Weinberger (Organ). TYXart / BR KLASSIK, TXA15052. Darunter die Orgelfuge über einen gregorianischen Choral op. 29/1. Bestell-Nr. TXA15052

Further reading 
 

 Eberhard Otto: Der Professor aus Kohlberg. In: Heimat Ostbayern. Nr. 5/1989, S. 42ff.
 
 Friedrich Blume (ed.): Die Musik in Geschichte und Gegenwart: allgemeine Enzyklopädie der Musik. With the collaboration of numerous music researchers at both home and abroad. 17 volumes. dtv, Munich/ Bärenreiter, Kassel among others. 1989,  (dtv) /  (Bärenreiter).
 Ludwig Finscher (ed.): Die Musik in Geschichte und Gegenwart. 26 volumes in two parts 2., revised edition. Bärenreiter/ Metzler, Kassel among others 2003, |(Bärenreiter)/  (Metzler).

References

External links 
 
 
 Werkeverzeichnis auf Klassika
 Operone beerwalbrunn
 
 Anton Beer-Walbrunn Kunst- und Kulturverein Kohlberg
 

German Romantic composers
1864 births
1929 deaths
Musicians from Regensburg